Brian Spooner may refer to:
 Brian Spooner (anthropologist)
 Brian Spooner (mycologist)